The Bor Skate Plaza is the first skatepark in Bor, Serbia and also the biggest skate plaza in the Balkans. It opened on May 4th 2012. 

The skatepark features ramps and ledges with different heights, a euro gap, inclined banks and two grind rails.

References 

Bor, Serbia
Skateparks in Serbia
Sports venues in Bor, Serbia